A Ghost on Holiday (Swedish: Spöke på Semester) is a 1951 Swedish comedy film directed by Gösta Bernhard and starring Stig Järrel, Ingrid Backlin and Sven Magnusson. It was shot at the Centrumateljéerna Studios in Stockholm. The film's sets were designed by the art director P.A. Lundgren.

Cast
 Stig Järrel as Trynvald Borgkrona / Sebastian Borgkrona
 Ingrid Backlin as Gullan Adolfsvärd
 Sven Magnusson as 	Maalbrott, lawyer
 Åke Fridell as 	Bovén, agronomist
 Arne Källerud as 	Viktor
 Douglas Håge as 	Mr. Vilhelm Adolfsvärd
 Astrid Bodin as 	Mrs. Adolfsvärd
 Git Gay as Saloon singer
 Irene Söderblom as 	Fair Beatrice
 Kai Gullmar as White lady
 Georg Adelly as 	The bat
 Ulla-Carin Rydén as 	Karin
 Eric Gustafson as 	Bartender
 Helga Brofeldt as 	Julia
 Tom Walter as Simonsson
 Birger Åsander as 	Algot
 Margit Andelius as 	Kristin
 Carl-Axel Elfving as 	Story-teller at radio 
 Carl-Gustaf Lindstedt as 	Kling from country police 
 Wilma Malmlöf as Beata, cook 
 John Melin as 	Monk 
 John Norrman as	Gold digger

References

Bibliography 
 Krawc, Alfred. International Directory of Cinematographers, Set- and Costume Designers in Film: Denmark, Finland, Norway, Sweden (from the beginnings to 1984). Saur, 1986.
 Qvist, Per Olov & von Bagh, Peter. Guide to the Cinema of Sweden and Finland. Greenwood Publishing Group, 2000.

External links 
 

1951 films
Swedish comedy films
1951 comedy films
1950s Swedish-language films
Films directed by Gösta Bernhard
Films set in Stockholm
1950s Swedish films